Dimond may refer to:

People
 Anthony Dimond (1881–1953), American politician, U.S. House delegate from Alaska (1933–1945)
 Bobby Dimond (fl. 1940s–1950s), Australian rugby league footballer
 Diane Dimond (born 1952), American investigative journalist and TV commentator
 John H. Dimond (1918–1985), American jurist, member of inaugural Alaska Supreme Court
 Michael Dimond, Superior of Most Holy Family Monastery
 Peter Dimond (1938–2021), Australian rugby league footballer
 William Dimond (1781–c.1837), English playwright 
 William Wyatt Dimond (1750–1813), English actor and theatre manager

Other uses
 Dimond High School, Anchorage, Alaska, United States
 Dimond Center, a shopping mall in Anchorage, Alaska, United States
 Dimond District, Oakland, California
 Dimond Gorge, a gorge in Western Australia

See also
 Diamond (disambiguation)
 Dymond (disambiguation)